is one of four wards of Okayama, Okayama Prefecture, Japan. The name means "Central Ward."

The wards of Okayama were established when Okayama became a city designated by government ordinance on April 1, 2009.

External links

岡山市中区役所 (Ward office official home page)

Wards of Okayama